Marcus Valerius Messalla served as prefect of the fleet in Sicily in 210 BC, the ninth year of the Second Punic War, carried out a successful raid on the countryside around Utica.  He was nominated dictator, but his appointment was annulled.  Messalla was praetor peregrinus in 194 BC, and Roman consul for 188 BC, together with Gaius Livius Salinator

References

Roman patricians
2nd-century BC Roman consuls
Marcus